Basin Township is one of nine townships in Boyd County, Nebraska, United States. The population was 220 at the 2020 census, down from 228 at the 2010 census. The 2021 population estimate is 218. The Village of Naper lies within the Township.

See also
County government in Nebraska

References

External links
City-Data.com

Townships in Boyd County, Nebraska
Townships in Nebraska